Lyesse Laloui, (born 1963) is a Swiss engineer and Professor at EPFL, École Polytechnique Fédérale de Lausanne.  He is Chair full Professor of Soil Mechanics, Geo-Engineering and  Storage at EPFL's School of Architecture, Civil and Environmental Engineering and is the Director of the Soil Mechanics Laboratory

Laloui is active in the fields of geomechanics, sustainability and geo-energy. His work explores the multiphysical behaviour of energy geostructures, sustainable soil stabilisation, the behaviour of shales, radioactive waste disposal and carbon capture and storage. His efforts have led to publication of 13 books, over 340 journal publications and four patents.

Recognized as one of the world's top ranked scientists in field of Engineering and Technology, Laloui is the current vice-president for Europe of the ISSMGE. International Society for Soil Mechanics and Geotechnical Engineering and Editor In Chief of the Elsevier journal, Geomechanics for Energy and the Environment. A full member of the Swiss Academy of Engineering Sciences and recent recipient of a Doctorate Honoris Causa in Engineering from Heriot-Watt University, he is also the founding partner of the International Joint Research Center for Energy Geotechnics in China and has co-founded several start-ups including Geoeg, Medusoil, Nesol and Enerdrape.  Since 2017 Lyesse Laloui acts as an ambassador of Lausanne Montreux Congress (LMC) which brings together the experts from the economic region of Lausanne and Montreux.

Career 
Laloui studied civil engineering at Ecole Nationale des Travaux Publics, Algiers in 1987 before moving to France, where he obtained an Advanced Master in Soil and Structural Mechanics from Ecole Centrale Paris in 1989. In 1993 he completed his Ph.D.  titled: "Modelisation du comportement thermo–hydro–mecanique des milieux poreux anelastique "with honours: "Summa cum laude".

Joining EPFL in 1994 as a Research Fellow, he became a professor in 2006 and was appointed the head of the Soil Mechanics Laboratory (EPFL) in 2008. In 2012 he was appointed as the director of EPFL Civil Engineering Section and in 2014 became a member of the Direction of the School of Architecture, Civil and Environmental Engineering (ENAC) of EPFL.

In 2014 Lyesse Laloui established and became the editor-in-chief of the international journal Geomechanics for Energy and the Environment at the Elsevier publishing house. He created the Chair "Gaz Naturel" - Petrosvibri –dedicated to underground  sequestration and is a Honorary Director of the International Joint Research Center for Energy Geotechnics in Nanjing, China. In 2021, Lyesse Laloui was appointed as the European Vice President of the International Society for Soil Mechanics and Geotechnical Engineering (ISSMGE). Between 2007 and 2020 he was adjunct professor at the Pratt School of Civil and Environmental Engineering at Duke University. and advisory professor at Hohai University. between 2016 and 2019.

Laloui has collaborated or supervised numerous researchers including:

 Dr. Mathieu Nuth, Assistant Professor at University of Sherbrooke,
 Dr. Bertrand François, Assistant Professor at Université Libre de Bruxelles, 
 Dr. Alice Di Donna, Assistant Professor at University Grenoble-Alpes,
 Dr. Yafei Qiao, Assistant Professor at Tongji University,
 Dr Roman Makhnenko, Assistant Professor University of Illinois,
 Dr. Anne-Catherine Dieudonné, Assistant Professor of Engineering Geology at Delft University of Technology,
 Dr. Melis Sutman, Assistant Professor at Heriot-Watt University and
 Dr. Alessandro Rotta Loria, Assistant Professor of Civil and Environmental Engineering Northwestern University.

Awards and honors 

 Doctorat Honouris Causa in Engineering, Heriot-Watt University, 2022
 ERC Proof of Concept Grant (PoC), Construction & Environmental Biocementation in Real World Applications (CEBREWA ), 2020
 ERC Advanced Grant, Biogeos, 2018 
 30th Roberval Award in for the book "Mécanique des sols et Roches"
 RM Quigley Award from the Canadian Geotechnical Society, 2016
 “Excellent Contributions Award” of the International Association for Computer Methods and Advances in Geomechanics, 2008
Honorary lectures
 Vienna Terzaghi Lecture, 2021
 Kersten Lecture at the American Society of Civil Engineering (ASCE),Geo-congress, 2020
 12th G.A. Leonards Lecture from the University of Purdue, 2014
 Vardoulakis Lecture from the University of Minnesota, 2012

Selected works

References

External links 
 Lyesse Laloui's homepage at the EPFL
 Lyesse Laloui's publications indexed by Google Scholar
 Lyesse Laloui - Scopus index

1963 births
Living people
French civil engineers
Academic staff of the École Polytechnique Fédérale de Lausanne